Đông Anh is a rural district (huyện) of Hanoi, the capital city of Vietnam. Nguyễn Phú Trọng, current General Secretary of Vietnam since 2011, was born there on 14 April 1944. As of 2003, the district had a population of 277,795.

Geography 
Đông Anh district is bordered by Bắc Ninh province to the east, Gia Lâm district to the southeast, Mê Linh district to the west, the urban districts of Bắc Từ Liêm, Tây Hồ and Long Biên to the south, Sóc Sơn district to the north.

The district capital lies at Đông Anh.

Đông Anh district is subdivided to 24 commune-level subdivisions, including the township of Đông Anh (district capital) and the rural communes of: Bắc Hồng, Cổ Loa, Đại Mạch, Đông Hội, Dục Tú, Hải Bối, Kim Chung, Kim Nỗ, Liên Hà, Mai Lâm, Nam Hồng, Nguyên Khê, Tàm Xá, Thụy Lâm, Tiên Dương, Uy Nỗ, Vân Hà, Vân Nội, Việt Hùng, Vĩnh Ngọc, Võng La, Xuân Canh, Xuân Nộn.

References

Districts of Hanoi